is a series of jidaigeki novels written by Eiji Yoshikawa. The stories were originally serialized as a serial in the Japanese newspaper Osaka Mainichishimbun , between 1926 and 1927. It has been re-released in book format in 1927 and 1933.

Yoshikawa wrote the novel inspired by Shiba Kōkan's essay "Shunparōhikki".

Adaptations

Film
Naruto Hichō (1926–27) a Makinopro production.
Kōkayashiki (1949) a Daiei production, starring Kazuo Hasegawa and directed by Teinosuke Kinugasa.
Naruto Hichō (1954) a Toei production, starring Utaemon Ichikawa and directed by Kunio Watanabe.
Naruto Hichō Kōhen (1954) a Toei production, starring Utaemon Ichikawa and directed by Kunio Watanabe.
A Fantastic Tale of Naruto (1957) a Daiei production, starring Kazuo Hasegawa and directed by Teinosuke Kinugasa.
Naruto Hichō (1961) a Toei production, starring Kōji Tsuruta and directed by Kōkichi Uchida.
Naruto Hichō Kanketsuhen (1961) a Toei production, starring Kōji Tsuruta and directed by Kōkichi Uchida.

Television series
Naruto Hichō (1959) a KR production.
Naruto Hichō (1966) a Mainichi Broadcasting System production.
Naruto Hichō (1977–78) a NHK production, starring Masakazu Tamura.
Naruto Hichō (2018) a NHK production, starring Koji Yamamoto.

References

Jidaigeki films
Samurai films
Japanese film series
Fictional samurai
Japanese novels
Japanese historical novels
Japanese novels adapted into films
Jidaigeki
Jidaigeki television series